Fire Station No. 5 is a fire station located in Tacoma, Washington listed on the National Register of Historic Places.  It is currently still in active service, but was renamed Fire Station 4 when Tacoma's former Station 4 at 222 E 26th Street was closed.

Tacoma has since had two other Stations 5.  Tacoma's second fireboat station, which opened in 1983 at 3301 Ruston Way but has since ceased fire operations, and Tacoma's former Station 15 at 3510 E 11th St., which was closed in 2012 when a new Station 15 opened in Tacoma's lower east side.  The former Station 15 has since been considered for reopening and has been renamed Station 5.

See also
 List of National Historic Landmarks in Washington (state)

References

Art Deco architecture in Washington (state)
Buildings and structures in Tacoma, Washington
Fire stations completed in 1935
Fire stations on the National Register of Historic Places in Washington (state)
Government buildings completed in 1935
National Register of Historic Places in Tacoma, Washington